Jawahar Navodaya Vidyalaya, Cooch Behar(Bengali: জওহর নবোদয় বিদ্যালয়) is a CBSE affiliated school of Cooch Behar district of West Bengal under Patna region of Navodaya Vidyalaya Samiti (NVS). One of 596 JNV's known for its academics, spread all over India by the Government of India. This school is residence school and all facilities to the students are free of cost. The entrance test for admission into the 6th and 9th class of Jawahar Navodaya Vidyalaya Coochbehar is being conducted by the Navodaya Vidyalaya Samiti. The school syllabus is CBSE patterned. There are classes being conducted from 6th standard to 10th standard.

Affiliations 
JNV Cooch Behar is affiliated to Central Board of Secondary Education with affiliation number 2440012.

See also
 List of JNV schools

References

External links
Official Website of JNV Cooch Behar

Boarding schools in West Bengal
High schools and secondary schools in West Bengal
Cooch Behar
Schools in Cooch Behar district
Educational institutions established in 2006
2006 establishments in West Bengal